Jorge Aravena Llanca (born 11 May 1936) is a Chilean photographer, writer, researcher and singer-songwriter from Pichilemu. Aravena Llanca currently resides in Berlin, Germany, and is a professor at the Free University of Berlin.

Biography

In the 1970s, Aravena Llanca recorded the Cueca songs "Quiero Volver a Pichilemu" (song considered anthem of Pichilemu), "Invierno Cruel", and "Tonada al Macaya". He released the album "Cantando a mi tierra" in 1995 featuring these songs, in collaboration with Voces Costinas and Caucahue.

Jorge Aravena Llanca was named "Illustrious Son of Pichilemu" by the Municipality of Pichilemu.

As a photographer, he has exhibited photographs of Pablo Neruda, Jorge Luis Borges, Nicanor Parra, among others, in the National Library of Chile.

Aravena is a collaborator of El Marino, and writes a section named "Memorias de un Hijo Ilustre" (Memoirs of an Illustrious Son).

References

1936 births
Living people
Chilean photographers
Chilean male writers
20th-century Chilean male singers
Chilean singer-songwriters
Chilean expatriates in Germany
People from Pichilemu
Academic staff of the Free University of Berlin
20th-century Chilean male artists